Yuri Farneti (born 3 January 1996 in Angera) is an Italian professional squash player. As of February 2018, he was ranked number 170 in the world, and number 1 in Italy. He has played in the main draw of many professional PSA tournaments and competed in the World Games. As of February 2018, he was the highest ranked Italian player.

References

1996 births
Living people
Italian male squash players
Competitors at the 2017 World Games